Ivan Jukić may refer to:
 Ivan Jukić (footballer)
 Ivan Jukić (rower)
 Ivan Jukić (water polo)
 Ivan Jukić (basketball)